The Samsung NC10 is a subnotebook/netbook computer designed by Samsung. At the time of its introduction (2008), it was noted for its combination of a 10.2" screen and large 6-cell battery as standard, giving a battery life of up to 7.5 hours, a large hard disk drive and a release price of 499 USD (299 GBP).

Technical overview

Processor and memory
The Samsung NC10 uses a 1.6 GHz Intel Atom N270 processor running at FSB frequency of 533 MHz, and includes 1 GB of DDR2 800/6400 memory as standard. North bridge chipset is Intel 945GSE and south bridge is Intel ICH7-M. NC10 may be equipped with DDR2 667 or 800 MHz, but 945GSE GMCH supports DDR2 400/533 MHz only, so there is no reason to install memory faster than 533 MHz (PC2-4200). Internally, the NC10 has one slot for memory accepting memory modules up to 2 GB.

Display
The screen is a non-glossy display and measures 10.2 inches (259 mm) diagonally, and has a resolution of 1024×600 pixels. An external display can be used through the standard VGA connector.

Keyboard
The 83-key keyboard is 93% of the size of a full-size keyboard, with 17.7 mm pitch between keys and 2 mm travel on each key press, with some reviews claiming it is the best keyboard of any netbook yet released. The keyboard has also been treated with the anti-bacterial Silver Nano technology.

Storage
The standard internal hard drive size is 160 GB on a SATA 1.5 Gbit/s interface. It also includes an SD card slot, supporting MMC, SD and SDHC cards for additional storage.
The standard internal hard drive can be replaced with a Solid State Drive (SSD).

Problems with hardware

Some users noticed a white screen problem. After some time if the brightness is more than 40% screen goes completely white.

It has been reported on various forums that the problem relates to a faulty cable between the screen and motherboard. Users have had success in getting this fixed under the Samsung factory warranty. A YouTube video provides a simple DIY solution to the issue by fastening some screws around the screen.
Sometimes the main board develops bad through holes which can cause very strange symptoms as mentioned earlier, "BigClive" has documented a fix for OLED breakout boards with this symptom and a pin from old AMD laptop CPU such as Sempron can be used as well.

As these netbooks are quite old now the power switches and surrounding plastic are quite prone to failure. Repairing them is feasible and in the short term replacing it with a reed switch pair from old phones and small magnet does work as the switches are hard to find.
Part numbers include BA81-0588CA but this is also used on other machines notably the AOA270 and some HP laptops.

Also quite common with these are RAM failures, especially with the stock memory. It is believed that the failure is caused by deterioration in the memory chips used for serial presence detect and BIOS failures though rare do sometimes cause "black screen" similar to the early Aspire One units which can be recoverable using crisis boot disk and Alt Esc method.
Another method is to replace the defective BIOS chip entirely, with essential bits copied from a second unit so that the laptop does not then throw a "BIOS password" related error; these usually cost between £10 and £18

An interesting note with these, the BIOS battery sometimes goes bad and replacing it can solve clock issues as well as being an "if all else fails" test before resorting to a chip replacement.
Due to the way these are made it is sometimes feasible to make a new module using heatshrink, the old salvaged battery cables with nickel tags and some Z axis screen repair tape with blue cure nail varnish as an anti-vibration method if original batteries can't be shipped.

Operating systems

Windows platform
The NC10 was shipped with Windows XP Home Edition and can be upgraded to Windows Vista, Windows 7, Windows 8.1, or Windows 10.

Linux
Linux (e.g. Ubuntu Netbook Edition, Xubuntu, Lubuntu, or Debian) runs well with the stock 1GB of RAM.

"Hackintosh" platform
The NC10 can be used as the platform to run Mac OS X using the IDeneb installation method. This combination of installing Apple's operating system on non-Apple hardware is often referred to as a "hackintosh" computer. In many cases, some features of either the hardware or software may not be totally functional or work as intended. There have been several such issues reported when using the NC10's default hardware.

Cloudready
The netbook can also be effectively turned into a "Chromebook" by installing the Cloudready operating system by Neverware. The Newest version does work on the NC10, though the SIM slot is not functional.

Colors and configurations
The NC10 is available in different colors and configurations. Colors include white, black, blue and pink. The configurations may differ in the lack of Bluetooth, e.g. in Spanish markets and some models in German markets, the fitting of a UMTS/HSDPA module, a weaker battery, or a stronger battery and a slightly bigger but non-multitouch touchpad as "special edition", available in the US.

The new model N110 is an upgrade of the basic NC10 design, with improved battery life, modified touchpad and improved styling.

See also
 Comparison of netbooks

References

External links
 Samsung NC10 Official Support Page
 Samsung NC10 Community Forum
 Samsung NC10 UK Review

Netbooks
NC10